Heber Javier Méndez Leiva (born 6 November 1982) is a Uruguayan professional footballer who plays as a defender or midfielder for Progreso.

Career
Méndez started his career with Progreso, featuring for the club for five years from 2003 in both the Segunda División and Primera División; with the team winning promotion in 2005–06. Moves to top-flight Central Español and second tier El Tanque Sisley followed, along with twenty-five appearances and two goals. On 18 September 2010, Méndez signed for Campeonato Brasileiro Série B side Paraná. After being an unused substitute for matches with Portuguesa and São Caetano, Méndez made his debut against ASA on 13 November. He played in four Serie B games in 2010 and 2011, as well as playing seven times in the Campeonato Paranaense.

In May 2011, Méndez signed with Campeonato Paranaense lower league team Agex/Iguaçu. Top tier J. Malucelli, then known as Corinthians Paranaense, signed him five months later, with Méndez making seventeen appearances in the state league as they finished ninth overall. Méndez completed a return to Uruguay with Cerrito on 3 October 2012. Méndez joined Cerro ahead of the 2013–14 Primera División season, prior to spending the following campaign in Cerro Largo's ranks. He was sent off three times across twenty matches with Cerro Largo, which matched his goal tally for them. A move to Rentistas was completed in mid-2015.

Having suffered relegation from the Primera División with Rentistas, Méndez left to rejoin Progreso of the Segunda División on 18 August 2016. One goal in twenty-seven fixtures occurred in 2017 as they were promoted to the 2018 Primera División. Despite making just two starts due to injury in 2018, Méndez signed a new contract with Progreso in December.

Career statistics
.

Honours
Progreso
Segunda División: 2005–06

El Tanque Sisley
Segunda División: 2009–10

References

External links

1982 births
Living people
Footballers from Montevideo
Uruguayan footballers
Association football defenders
Association football midfielders
Uruguayan expatriate footballers
Expatriate footballers in Brazil
Uruguayan expatriate sportspeople in Brazil
Uruguayan Segunda División players
Uruguayan Primera División players
Campeonato Brasileiro Série B players
C.A. Progreso players
Central Español players
El Tanque Sisley players
Paraná Clube players
J. Malucelli Futebol players
Sportivo Cerrito players
C.A. Cerro players
Cerro Largo F.C. players
C.A. Rentistas players